This is a list of films produced by the Cinema of Telangana film industry based in Hyderabad, Telangana in 1967.

External links
 Earliest Telugu language films at IMDb.com (465 to 494)

1967
Telugu
Telugu films